These quarterbacks have started at least one game for the Dallas Cowboys of the National Football League. They are listed in order of the date of each player's first start at quarterback for the Cowboys.

Starting quarterbacks
The number of games they started during the season is listed to the right:

Regular season

Postseason

Most games as starting quarterback
These quarterbacks have the most starts for the Cowboys in regular season games (through the 2022 NFL season).

Team career passing records

(Through the 2022 NFL season)

Dallas Cowboys

quarterbacks